Behind the Eyes is the twelfth studio album by Christian music and pop music singer Amy Grant, released in 1997.

Issued near the end of Grant's marriage to Christian singer-songwriter Gary Chapman, many of the songs on Behind the Eyes reflect Grant's struggles in her marriage and all relate to a theme of optimism. Upon its release, it went to No. 2 on Billboards Christian albums chart and No. 8 on the Billboard 200. Meanwhile, the first single from the album, "Takes a Little Time", was a Top Five Adult Contemporary hit and a Top Thirty pop chart single. "Like I Love You" and "I Will Be Your Friend" also reached the Adult Contemporary chart, at No. 10 and No. 27, respectively. The album was also released in a limited two-CD version (with the second CD titled, More Music From Behind the Eyes) with two additional songs.

The album was listed at No. 44 in the 2001 book, CCM Presents: The 100 Greatest Albums in Christian Music and was Grant's highest-placed non-Christmas album, reaching No. 8 on the Billboard 200, compared with Heart in Motion (1991), which reached No. 10, and How Mercy Looks from Here (2013), which reached No. 12.

In 2007, Behind the Eyes was reissued and digitally remastered by Grant's new record label, EMI/Sparrow Records, along with her 13 other albums. The remastered edition is labeled with a "Digitally Remastered" logo in the 'gutter' on the CD front. Because of Grant's deal with her previous label, Word Records, the remastered editions of Behind the Eyes and A Christmas to Remember were not sold in Christian music retailers such as Family Christian Stores or Lifeway Christian Resources until 2009. Until that time, Word Records continued to distribute those titles to Christian retailers in the original, non-remastered editions while EMI distributed the remastered editions to most major retailers. The 12 remaining remastered editions are distributed by EMI to all US retailers, both Christian and secular.

In 2022, in celebration of the album's 25th anniversary, it was reissued on September 9th, exactly 25 years to the day of the original album's release. The expanded reissue includes the original 12-song album, previously unreleased songs and demos from the original album's sessions, b-sides, bonus tracks and re-recordings of previously released songs, released on 2 CDs, a 3 LP vinyl set and digitally on music purchasing and streaming platforms.

 Track listing 

 Personnel 

 Amy Grant – lead vocals, backing vocals (1), acoustic guitar (11)
 Keith Thomas – arrangements (1-4, 6, 9, 11), synthesizer programming (1), acoustic guitar (1), electric guitar (1, 4), keyboards (2, 3, 4, 6, 9, 11), guitars (6), string arrangements (11)
 Phil Madeira – Hammond B3 organ (2, 5, 6, 12), accordion (3)
 Tim Lauer – accordion (5), melodica (5), pump organ (5), Wurlitzer keyboard (8)
 John Magine – accordion (7)
 Carl Marsh – Fairlight euphonium (8), keyboards (10)
 Matt Rollings – acoustic piano (12)
 Dann Huff – electric guitars (1, 2, 11), guitars (3)
 Gordon Kennedy – acoustic guitars (2, 4, 6), electric guitar (4, 5, 8, 10, 11, 12)
 Kenny Greenberg – electric guitar (4), guitars (6)
 Jerry McPherson – electric guitar (5, 7, 8), gut-string guitar (7), acoustic guitar (7), laud guitar (7), keyboard bassoon (8), EBow (10)
 Wayne Kirkpatrick – acoustic guitar (5, 7, 8, 10, 12), harmony vocals (5), backing vocals (5, 8), hi-strung guitar (8), hammered dulcimer (8, 10)
 Jerry Douglas – dobro (7)
 Greg Leisz – pedal steel guitar (8, 10)
 David Lindley – Weissenborn guitar (10)
 Spencer Campbell – bass (2)
 Byron House – bass (3, 6, 11)
 Tommy Sims – bass (4, 9), acoustic guitar (9)
 Jimmie Lee Sloas – bass (5, 7, 8)
 Larry Klein –  bass (10), fretless bass (10)
 Jackie Street – bass (12)
 Mark Hammond – drums (1, 2, 6, 11), bass programming (1), drum programming (4), Hammond B3 organ (9)
 Steve Brewster – drums (3)
 Chad Cromwell – drums (4)
 Chris McHugh – drums (5, 7, 12)
 Dan Needham – drums (9)
 John Hammond – drums (8, 10), shaker (10), tambourine (10)
 Terry McMillan – percussion (3, 4, 6, 11), harmonica (4)
 Sam Bacco – percussion (7, 8)
 Sam Levine – flute (11)
 Ronn Huff – string arrangements (11)
 Carl Gorodetzsky – strings (11)
 Bob Mason – strings (11)
 Kristin Wilkinson – strings (11)
 William Owsley – backing vocals (6, 9), acoustic guitar (9), electric guitar (9, 12)
 Lisa Cochran – backing vocals (1, 2, 4)
 Tabitha Fair – backing vocals (2, 4, 7)
 Michelle Lewis – backing vocals (2)
 Kim Keyes – backing vocals (3, 7)
 Rick Polmbi – backing vocals (5, 7)
 Christine Denté – backing vocals (10)
 Billy Gaines – backing vocals (12)
 Donna McElroy – backing vocals (12)
 Chris Rodriguez – backing vocals (12)ProductionTracks 1–4, 6, 9, 11 Keith Thomas – producer
 Shaun Shankel – production coordinator
 Bill Whittington – engineer, mixing
 Shawn McLean – assistant engineer (1)
 Greg Parker – assistant engineer (2, 3, 4, 6, 9, 11)Tracks 5, 7, 8, 10, 12 Wayne Kirkpatrick – producer
 D'Ann McAlister – production assistant
 Dan Marnien – engineer, mixing, overdub recording
 Chuck Linder – assistant engineer
 Patrick Murphy – assistant engineer
 David Nottingham – mix assistant, overdub recording assistant
 JB – overdub recording
 Craig Hansen – overdub recording
 Tom Laune – overdub recording
 Eric Elwell – overdub recording assistant
 Eric Greedy – overdub recording assistant
 Andy Haller – overdub recording assistant
 Thomas Johnson – overdub recording assistant
 Frank Rinella – overdub recording assistant
 F. Reid Shippen – overdub recording assistant
 Glen Spinner – overdub recording assistant
 Michael Zainer – overdub recording assistantOther credits David Anderle – executive producer
 Michael Blanton – executive producer
 Amy Grant – executive producer
 Bob Ludwig – mastering at Gateway Mastering, Portland, Maine
 Greg Ross – art direction, design
 Kurt Markus – photography
 Lilly Lee – hand lettering

 Charts 
Weekly charts

 End of year charts 

 End-of-decade charts 

Certifications and sales

 Awards GMA Dove Awards'

References 

Amy Grant albums
1997 albums
A&M Records albums